Armand Marcelle (10 October 1905 – 26 December 1974) was a French rower who won a silver medal in the coxed pairs at the 1928 Summer Olympics, together with his younger brother Édouard.

References

1905 births
1974 deaths
French male rowers
Olympic rowers of France
Rowers at the 1928 Summer Olympics
Olympic silver medalists for France
Olympic medalists in rowing
Sportspeople from Reims
Medalists at the 1928 Summer Olympics
20th-century French people